Dalaffilla, also called Gabuli, or Alu-Dalafilla is a  high stratovolcano in Ethiopia. It is the highest point of Gulina. The only recorded eruption of Dalaffilla occurred in 2008 when lava flows from its western and northwestern flanks traveled to the northeast.

References

Stratovolcanoes of Ethiopia
Active volcanoes